Dmitriy Alexandrovich Tsvetkov (born September 10, 1983) is a Russian orienteering competitor and past European champion. He received a gold medal in the long distance at the 2008 European Orienteering Championships in Ventspils, and also a gold medal in the relay event, together with Andrey Khramov and Valentin Novikov. Dmitry also won two gold medals at JWOC 2003 in Estonia in a classic distance and relay. On March 5, 2022, Dmitry Tsvetkov supported the Russian invasion of Ukraine.

References

External links
 
 

1983 births
Living people
Russian orienteers
Male orienteers
Foot orienteers
World Orienteering Championships medalists
World Games gold medalists
World Games silver medalists
World Games bronze medalists
Competitors at the 2009 World Games
Competitors at the 2017 World Games
World Games medalists in orienteering
Junior World Orienteering Championships medalists